Dorsing Ronghang is an Indian politician from Bharatiya Janata Party. In May 2021, he was elected as a member of the Assam Legislative Assembly from Howraghat (constituency). He defeated Sanjeeb Teron of Indian National Congress by 26,244 votes in 2021 Assam Assembly election.

References 

Living people
Year of birth missing (living people)
21st-century Indian politicians
People from Karbi Anglong district
Bharatiya Janata Party politicians from Assam
Assam MLAs 2021–2026
Members of the Assam Legislative Assembly